Seattle Sessions is an acoustic EP released by The Classic Crime in 2007 through Tooth & Nail Records.

Track listing 
"Seattle" – 4:31
"Blindfolded" – 2:37
"The Test" – 3:58
"Wake Up (Shipwreck)" – 4:34
"The Drink In My Hand" – 5:09
"When The Time Comes" – 3:51
"Far From Home" – 4:35

Personnel
The Classic Crime
Matt MacDonald - vocals, guitars, keyboards
Justin Duque - guitars, piano, background vocals
Robbie Negrin - guitars, background vocals
Alan Clark - bass guitar
Skip Erickson - drums, background vocals

Additional personnel
Kristie Macdonald - vocals
Ruth Erickson - vocals
Matt Bayles - piano, percussion

References

2007 EPs
The Classic Crime albums
Tooth & Nail Records EPs
Albums produced by Matt Bayles